Capo Cefalù Lighthouse is an active lighthouse located on the promontory of Capo Cefalù under the steep limestone ridge,  high, named Rocca east of Cefalù, Sicily on the Tyrrhenian Sea.

Description
The tower is unpainted and the lantern is in white; the lantern dome in grey metallic. The lighthouse is completely automated and managed by the Marina Militare with the identification code number 3261 E.F.

See also
 List of lighthouses in Italy
 Cefalù

References

External links

 Servizio Fari Marina Militare

Lighthouses in Italy
Buildings and structures in the Province of Palermo
Lighthouses completed in 1900
1900 establishments in Italy